"Let's Call the Whole Thing Off" is a song written by George Gershwin and Ira Gershwin for the 1937 film Shall We Dance, where it was introduced by Fred Astaire and Ginger Rogers as part of a celebrated dance duet on roller skates. The sheet music has the tempo marking of "Brightly". The song was ranked No. 34 on AFI's 100 Years...100 Songs.

Background
The song is most famous for its "You like to-may-to  / And I like to-mah-to " and other verses comparing British and American English pronunciations.

The differences in pronunciation are not simply regional, however, but serve more specifically to identify class differences. At the time, typical American pronunciations were considered less "refined" by the upper-class, and there was a specific emphasis on the "broader" a sound. This class distinction with respect to pronunciation has been retained in caricatures, especially in the theater, where the longer a pronunciation is most strongly associated with the word darling.

Recordings 

 1936 Kitty Brown also recorded the song with Les Brown and His Duke Blue Devils.
 Fred Astaire with Johnny Green & His Orchestra (1937)
 Shep Fields and his Riplling Rhythm Orchestra with vocalist Bobby Goday (1937) <ref> [https://archive.org/details/78_lets-call-the-whole-thing-off_shep-fields-and-his-rippling-rhythm-orchestra-bobby_gbia0152256b Shep Fields performs "Let's Call the Whole Thing Off on archive.org]</ref>
 Billie Holiday – Lady Day: The Complete Billie Holiday on Columbia 1933–1944 (1937)
 Sam Cooke – Tribute to the Lady (1959)
 Ella Fitzgerald – on Ella Fitzgerald Sings the George and Ira Gershwin Songbook (1959), on the 1983 Pablo release Nice Work If You Can Get It, and in a 1957 duet with Louis Armstrong on Ella and Louis Again. Bing Crosby and Rosemary Clooney recorded the song for their radio show in 1960 and it was subsequently released on the CD Bing & Rosie - The Crosby-Clooney Radio Sessions (2010).
 Harry Connick Jr. for the soundtrack for When Harry Met Sally (1989)
 Uri Caine – Rhapsody in Blue (2013)
 Willie Nelson with Cyndi Lauper on Summertime: Willie Nelson Sings Gershwin (2016)

Popular culture
The song has been re-used in filmmaking and television production, most notably in When Harry Met Sally... – where it is performed by Louis Armstrong – and The Simpsons.
In the February 18, 1970, Anne Bancroft television special, "Annie: The Women in the Life of a Man," Bancroft appears in a comedy sketch with David Susskind where she plays a hapless singer in an audition who sings the song from sheet music, cluelessly ignoring the different pronunciation of to-may-to and to-mah-to, etc. Ira Gershwin relates a similar incident in his 1959 book. An essentially similar sketch was performed by comedians John Bird and John Fortune in the 1976 Amnesty International benefit concert A Poke in the Eye (With a Sharp Stick).
The tune was also featured in the 2012 Broadway Musical Nice Work If You Can Get It.
In a trailer of 2021 film Venom: Let There Be Carnage'', Venom sings the song while it is playing on the radio.
In the Muppet Show episode #350, Sylvester Stallone sings a modified version of the song while dressed as a Roman gladiator and battling a dancing lion.

References

Further reading
 
 

1937 songs
1937 singles
Songs written for films
Songs with music by George Gershwin
Songs with lyrics by Ira Gershwin
Male–female vocal duets
Louis Armstrong songs